KeePassX started as a Linux port of KeePass, which was at that time an open-source but Windows-only password manager. Both are now cross platform, with KeePassX using Qt libraries and recent versions of KeePass using .NET / Mono. It is built using version 5 of the Qt toolkit, making it a multi-platform application, which can be run on Linux, Windows, and macOS.

KeePassX uses the KeePass 2 (.kdbx) password database format as the native format. It can also import (and convert) the older KeePass 1 (.kdb) databases.

As of December 2021, KeePassX is no longer actively maintained. 

There is a community fork of KeePassX, called KeePassXC.

See also

 List of password managers
 Password manager
 Cryptography

References

External links
 
 

Free password managers
Software that uses Qt